The 1998 Australian Constitutional Convention was a Constitutional Convention which gathered at Old Parliament House, Canberra from 2 to 13 February 1998. It was called by the Howard Government to discuss whether Australia should become a republic. The convention concluded with "in principle support" for an Australian republic (with a dissenting minority voting for a continuation of the Australian constitutional monarchy) and proposed a model involving appointment of the head of state by Parliament.  The model was put to a referendum in November 1999 and rejected by the Australian electorate.

Background

Australia remains a constitutional monarchy under the Australian Constitution adopted in 1901, with the duties of the head of state performed by a Governor-General selected by the Australian Prime Minister. Australian republicanism has persisted since colonial times, though for much of the 20th century, the monarchy remained popular. In the early 1990s, republicanism became a significant political issue. Australian Labor Party Prime Minister Paul Keating indicated a desire to instigate a republic in time for the Centenary of the Federation of Australia in 2001. The opposition Liberal-National Coalition, led by Alexander Downer, though less supportive of the republic plan, promised to convene a Constitutional Convention to discuss the issue. Under John Howard, the Coalition won the 1996 Federal Election and set the Convention date for February 1998.

Composition

The convention comprised 152 delegates from all of the states and territories of Australia – half elected by voluntary postal vote and half appointed by the federal government. Of the appointees, 40 were representatives of the commonwealth, state and territory parliaments. Various pro-republican and pro-monarchy delegates were elected and various parliamentary and non-parliamentary delegates were appointed including state and territory leaders. The convention was chaired by the Right Honourable Ian Sinclair , of the National Party of Australia with the Honourable Barry Jones  of the Australian Labor Party as deputy chairman.

Prominent advocates

Parliamentarians
Sitting members of the Liberal-National Party Coalition were permitted a free vote on the republican issue, while the Australian Labor Party (ALP) adopted the republican position as a matter of party policy.  Senior Liberals split on the issue, with the Prime Minister, John Howard, supporting the status quo and the Treasurer, Peter Costello, supporting a republic. Other representatives of the government at the convention included the Attorney General, Daryl Williams, the Minister for the Environment, Robert Hill, and the Minister for Social Security, Jocelyn Newman, as well as the Deputy Prime Minister, Tim Fischer, and other Members of Parliament. The Leader of the Opposition, Kim Beazley, was accompanied by colleagues Gareth Evans, John Faulkner and others, while the Australian Democrats sent Senator Natasha Stott Despoja.

The states all sent three representatives including their premiers and opposition leaders, while the territories were represented by their chief ministers. Premiers Bob Carr (New South Wales), Jeff Kennett (Victoria), Rob Borbidge (Queensland), Richard Court (Western Australia), John Olsen (South Australia) and Tony Rundle (Tasmania) attended, along with chief ministers Kate Carnell (Australian Capital Territory) and Shane Stone (Northern Territory).

ARM and ACM

A number of members of the Australian Republican Movement (ARM) attended the convention. ARM was established in July 1991 and comprised distinguished Australian intellectuals, politicians and former politicians, business people, students and other citizens who supported an Australian republic. A number of Australian Labor Party supporters and members were attracted to the organisation, though its leader from 1993 to 2000 was future Liberal Prime Minister Malcolm Turnbull. Prominent delegates at the Convention included media personalities Steve Vizard and Eddie McGuire, businesswoman Janet Holmes à Court and businessman Lindsay Fox.

Australians for Constitutional Monarchy was established in 1992, after Prime Minister Keating announced his republican agenda. The organisation was called together to counter the republican movement by Justice Michael Kirby and like minded constitutional monarchists including Lloyd Waddy , Aboriginal statesman Neville Bonner, Chancellor of the University of Sydney Dame Leonie Kramer, Helen Sham-Ho  (the first Chinese-born member of an Australian Parliament), Doug Sutherland (former Labor Lord Mayor of Sydney) and others.

Later, former Labor leader and Governor General Bill Hayden joined the organisation and membership grew to more than  registered supporters nationwide. Justice Kirby argued that a constitutional monarchy is "a system of government for those committed to effective checks on rulers and to liberal democracy". Kirby resigned from the organisation upon being appointed a judge of the High Court of Australia and did not participate in the Convention. ACM recruited Tony Abbott as its first full-time executive director, although his membership also ceased following pre-selection as a Liberal candidate for election to the Federal Parliament in March 1996. Kerry Jones was then appointed executive director of ACM in his place. She and Lloyd Waddy led ACM through the 1998 Constitutional Convention and the 1999 referendum. Don Chipp, founder of the Australian Democrats, was one of ACM's delegates at the Convention.

Others
Smaller republican groupings included "A Just Republic", the "Real Republic" group, the Clem Jones "Queensland Constitutional Republic Team" and the Ted Mack group. Other monarchist groups included the "Constitutional Monarchists" group, the Australian Monarchist League and "Safeguard the People".  Other minor Australian political parties with elected representatives included the Shooters Party, the Christian Democrats (Fred Nile Group). A number of individuals were elected under other grouping names, including lawyer Jason Yat-Sen Li ("A Multi-Cultural Voice") and Misha Schubert ("Republic4U – The Youth Ticket").

Six Indigenous delegates participated in the Convention, including magistrate Pat O'Shane, who was vocal in support of a republic and monarchist Neville Bonner, Australia's first Aboriginal parliamentarian, who ended his contribution to the Convention with a Jagera Tribal Sorry Chant in sadness at the deception practised by republicans. The Republican Model, as well as a proposal for a new Constitutional Preamble which would have included the "honouring" of Aboriginals and Torres Strait Islanders.

Lady Florence Bjelke-Petersen and Glen Sheil represented the group named "Constitutional Monarchists", while prominent Returned and Services League spokesman Bruce Ruxton represented the monarchist "Safeguard the People" group and Brigadier Alf Garland represented the Australian Monarchist League. Ted Mack and Phil Cleary were prominent independent republicans.

Clergy from the major churches were appointed as delegates: the Catholic Church in Australia's George Pell and the Anglican Church of Australia' s Peter Hollingworth; while republican Tim Costello, a prominent Baptist minister was elected as a representative for Victoria from the "Real Republic Group".

Other appointees included academics, such as historian Geoffrey Blainey and Sydney University chancellor Leonie Kramer; legal and constitutional experts such as law professor Greg Craven retired judge Richard McGarvie and public servant David Smith. Former Vice Regal office holders were also appointed, including former Governor of South Australia Dame Roma Mitchell and former Governor General Bill Hayden. Senior business appointees included Sir Arvi Parbo and Donald McGauchie. Journalist delegates included Mia Handshin and Miranda Devine.

Debate and conclusions

The Convention debated the need for a change to the Constitution of Australia which would remove the monarchy from a role in Australian government and law. According to the final communiqué issued by the Convention, three questions were considered:

Whether or not Australia should become a republic; which republic model should be put to the voters to consider against the current system of government; in what time frame and under what circumstances might any change be considered.

Delegates advocated a range of positions from no-change to minimal change to radical change. According to the final communique:

Three categories of model for a possible Australian republic were before the convention. They were: direct election, parliamentary election by a special majority, and appointment by a special council following prime ministerial nomination.

"In principle" agreement was reached by a majority of delegates for an Australian Republic (though a minority bloc of Monarchists dissented).  Following a series of votes, a proposal for a "Bipartisan Appointment of the President Model" for an Australian republic was endorsed by a majority of delegates who voted for or against the motion (monarchists and some radical-change republicans abstained from the vote). According to hansard, the vote for the Bi-Partisan model was: "for" 73, "against" 57 with 22 abstentions.

The final communiqué recommended that Parliament establish a committee responsible for considering the nominations for the position of president and consult widely in the community and compile a shortlist for the Prime Minister. Taking into account the recommendations of the committee, the Prime Minister would then present a single nominee, seconded by the Opposition Leader to a joint sitting of the Australian Parliament which must gain a two-thirds majority in order to be endorsed. The president could be removed at any time by a notice in writing signed by the Prime Minister, however if the House of Representatives failed to ratify this dismissal, the president would be eligible for re-appointment. The powers of the president were to be those of the existing office of Governor General of Australia.

The Convention recommended that state parliaments also examine the issue of the republic, as each state has separate and individual constitutional links to the monarchy. Certain recommendations were made for a new Constitutional preamble which included introductory language along the lines of "we the Australian people", and referencing "Almighty God", custodianship and occupancy of Australia by Indigenous Australians; as well as affirmations of the law, cultural diversity, unique land and environment and democratic political system of Australia.

The new Australian republic was to retain the name Commonwealth of Australia.

The Convention recommended to the Prime Minister and Parliament of Australia that the model, and other related changes to the Constitution, supported by the convention, be put to the people in a constitutional referendum in 1999.

The minimalist McGarvie Model developed by former Governor of Victoria, Richard McGarvie, and originally submitted to the Republic Advisory Committee in 1993, was the second most popular model of the four voted upon. Republican delegates Clem Jones, Ted Mack, Pat O'Shane, Paul Tully and Paddy O'Brien held out for greater change to the Constitution than the more minimalist model ultimately proposed.

Arguments by key advocates

In his address to the opening session of the Convention, Liberal Prime Minister John Howard outlined his support for retaining the status quo on the basis that it has provided a long period of stability and said he believed that the "separation of the ceremonial and executive functions of government" and the presence of a neutral "defender of constitutional integrity" was an advantage in government and that no republican model would be as effective in providing such an outcome as the Australian monarchy:

The Deputy Prime Minister, Tim Fischer, of the National Party said that the Australian Constitution had delivered one of the "oldest continuous federated democracies in the world" and that changing it would be a complex operation:

Opposition Leader Kim Beazley of the Australian Labor Party advocated "minimalist" change. He described transition to a republic as "unfinished business" for Australia and said that foreigners "find it strange and anachronistic, as many Australians now clearly do, that our Head of State is not an Australian". The ALP proposed appointment of a president by two-thirds majority of parliament. In his opening address, Beazley told the Convention:

Liberal Treasurer Peter Costello advocated for a republic. He rejected any suggestion that Australia was not already an independent nation and said that, while the Australian Constitution works "remarkably well", it was the institution of monarchy that was the crux of his argument for change:

Pat O'Shane, a magistrate and indigenous woman expressed a desire for change based on what she perceived as historical injustice and present inadequacies within the Australian Constitution:

Indigenous delegates were divided, however. Former Senator Neville Bonner made an impassioned defence of the constitutional monarchy, describing efforts to change it as "senseless division" and a distraction from the real problems facing Australia:

Kerry Jones, leader of Australians for Constitutional Monarchy defended the Australian Constitution, saying "no republic model will ever offer the protection and safeguards that work so well in our current Constitution". She said her task was to "assess each republican model against the Constitution that has served us so well":

Delegates examined various models for a republic. Independent republican delegate Phil Cleary argued the case for direct-election of a president and questioned the motivations of  "conservative" republicans:

Malcolm Turnbull, leader of the Australian Republican Movement, cautioned against mixing the roles of President and Prime Minister in a direct election system, telling the Convention:

The Catholic Archbishop of Melbourne, George Pell, supported change, but noted "Without support from most of the front benches of both sides of the parliament, it would be wasteful to go to a referendum." Towards the end of proceedings, he called on conservatives to support change:

Aftermath

Two proposals to amend the Australian Constitution were submitted to the Australian electorate in November 1999. If approved, the referendum would have established a republican system of government in Australia. The referendum held on 6 November 1999 failed to achieve the support of either a majority of voters or a majority of states. The national vote of the electors in favour of Australia becoming a republic was 45.13%, with 54.87% against. Australia remains a constitutional monarchy.

Delegates

A total of 152 delegates, from each state and territory and a wide diversity of backgrounds, gathered at Old Parliament House in Canberra. Seventy-six of the delegates were elected by a voluntary postal ballot. The other seventy-six were appointed by the federal government.

List of elected delegates

List of appointed delegates

See also
 Pledge of Loyalty Act 2006 
 History of Australia
 Australian Constitutional history
 Australian Constitution
 Monarchy in Australia

References

External links

 Proceedings of the 1998 Convention
 The Australian Broadcasting Commission's 1998 Convention website
 National Library of Australia

Australian constitutional law
Republicanism in Australia
Australia
Political history of Australia
Legal history of Australia
Government of Australia
 
Conventions in Australia
1998 in Australian law